Kari Tiainen (born 26 August 1966 in Riihimäki) is a Finnish former professional enduro rider. He competed in the World Enduro Championships from 1989 to 2003. Tiainen is notable for being a seven-time World Enduro Champion and held the record for most wins in the world championship (77), until the record was broken by compatriot Juha Salminen during the 2008 season. In 2012, Tiainen was named an FIM Legend for his motorcycling achievements.

Motorcycle racing career
Tiainen has also participated in several national championships, becoming a four-time German and two-time Finnish and Spanish champion. In addition to his personal world titles, he has won the International Six Days Enduro (ISDE) World Trophy for Finland in 1996, 1998, 1999 and 2003. He was the fastest rider in the 500 cc class in 1994, 1995, 1996, 1997 and 1999. In 1999, he also drove for Finland in the Race of Champions, alongside Tommi Mäkinen and JJ Lehto, and the team won the Nations' Cup.

Originally a motocross rider, Tiainen switched to enduro in 1989 and finished fourth in the European championship. The world championship was started the following year, and he took his first title with Suzuki in the 250 cc class. For the following year, he switched to Husqvarna and successfully defended his title. Tiainen then moved to the biggest 500 cc class, winning the title with Husqvarna in 1992, 1994, 1995 and 1997, and with KTM in 2000. From 1990 to 2000, even during the seasons that he finished runner-up, he led his class in the number of wins. The 2001 season, during which he finished third behind Anders Eriksson and Mika Ahola, was Tiainen's last full season in the world championship. After his racing career, Tiainen continued with KTM as the team principal from 2003 to 2005. In 2011, Tiainen became the team principal for Ice 1 Racing, Kimi Räikkönen's team in the Motocross World Championship.

Career summary

ISDE

References

External links 
 

1966 births
People from Riihimäki
Enduro riders
Finnish motorcycle racers
Living people
Sportspeople from Kanta-Häme